Mandl is a South German surname.  Notable people with the surname include:

Alex J. Mandl (born 1943), Austrian-American businessman
Daniel Mandl (1891–1945), Czech civil engineer, inventor, student of anthroposophy, and Holocaust victim, father of Herbert Thomas Mandl
Felix Mandl (1898–?), Croatian businessman and entrepreneur
Franz Mandl (1916–1988), Austrian footballer
Franz Mandl (1923–2009), British physicist
Friedrich Mandl (1900–1977), Austrian-Argentine businessman
Herbert Thomas Mandl (1926–2007), Czechoslovak-German author, son of Daniel Mandl
Jubilee Jenna Mandl (born 1984), Austrian figure skater
Jürgen Mandl (born 1965), Austrian athlete
Maria Mandl (1912–1948), Austrian Nazi SS commandant of the female camp at Auschwitz concentration camp executed for war crimes
Miklós Mandl, birth name of Nickolas Muray (1892-1965), Hungarian-born American photographer and Olympic fencer
Peter Mandl (born 1947), Swedish sculptor
Petr Mandl (1933–2012), Czech mathematician
Thomas Mandl (born 1979), Austrian footballer

See also
Mandel
Mandle
Joseph Mandl House, a historic house in Jerome, Idaho, United States

German-language surnames